Jarvis Dortch (born February 5, 1981) is an American politician who served in the Mississippi House of Representatives from the 66th district from 2016 to mid-2020 and currently serves as the Executive Director of the American Civil Liberties Union of Mississippi. The ACLU of Mississippi is the autonomously-run Mississippi state affiliate of the national American Civil Liberties Union.

References

1981 births
Living people
Democratic Party members of the Mississippi House of Representatives
21st-century American politicians